Subodh Ghosh (14 September 1909 – 10 March 1980) was a noted Indian author of Bengali literature and a journalist with the Kolkata-based daily newspaper Ananda Bazar Patrika. Born at Hazaribagh on 14 September 1909, now in Jharkhand, he studied in St. Columba's College as well as privately with scholar Mahesh Chandra Ghosh. At the beginning of his career, he worked as a bus conductor to support himself while writing on the side. His best known work, Bharat Premkatha, is about the romances of epic Indian characters and has remained very popular in the Bengali literary world. Many of his stories have been adapted for Indian films, most notably Ritwik Ghatak's Ajantrik (1958) and Bimal Roy's Sujata (1959). He won the Filmfare Award for Best Story twice, for Bimal Roy's Sujata (1960) and for Gulzar's Ijaazat in 1989. He was selected for Bharatya Jnanpith Award (1977) But he refused it.

Selected works 
Novels

Tilanjoli
Gangotri
Trijama
Preyoahy
Satkiya
Sujata
Suno Boronari
Bosonto Tilok
Jiavorli
Bagdatta

Story-Book

Fossil
Parashuramer Kuthar
Gotrantar
Suklavishar
Gram Jamuna
Bonikornika
Jatugriho
Mon Vramar
Thirbijuri
Kusumeshu
Bharat Premkatha
Jalkamal

Others

Bharityo Foujer Itihash
Kingbodontir Deshe
Amritopothojatri

References

 Writers from Kolkata

External links

1909 births
Novelists from Jharkhand
Bengali-language writers
Bengali writers
Indian male journalists
Indian male novelists
Filmfare Awards winners
Indian male short story writers
1980 deaths
People from Hazaribagh
20th-century Indian novelists
Journalists from Jharkhand
20th-century Indian short story writers
20th-century Indian journalists
20th-century Indian male writers
Recipients of the Ananda Purashkar